The 2022 Metro Atlantic Athletic Conference women's basketball tournament was the postseason women's basketball tournament for the Metro Atlantic Athletic Conference for the 2021–22 NCAA Division I women's basketball season. The tournament was played March 8–12, 2022, at the Jim Whelan Boardwalk Hall in Atlantic City, New Jersey, for the third year in a row. The tournament winner, the Fairfield Stags, received the conference's automatic bid to the 2022 NCAA Division I women's basketball tournament.

Seeds
All 11 teams in the conference participate in the tournament. The top five teams receive byes to the quarterfinals. Teams are seeded by record within the conference, with a tiebreaker system to seed teams with identical conference records.

Schedule

Bracket

* denotes number of overtimes

All-championship team

See also
 2022 MAAC men's basketball tournament

References

MAAC women's basketball tournament
Sports competitions in Atlantic City, New Jersey
2021–22 Metro Atlantic Athletic Conference women's basketball season
MAAC Women's Basketball
College basketball tournaments in New Jersey
Women's sports in New Jersey